La Pucelle may refer to:

 Gerard la Pucelle (circa 1117-1184), Roman Catholic bishop
 La Pucelle (saint) (circa 1412-1431), a.k.a. Joan of Arc, virgin saint and national heroine of France
 La Pucelle (ship), a fictional ship from Bernard Cornwell's novel Sharpe's Trafalgar
 La Pucelle: Tactics, a tactical role-playing game
 La Pucelle (violin), a.k.a. The Virgin, a 1709 violin made by Antonio Stradivari